Sphingonotus azurescens, the azure sand grasshopper, is a species of band-winged grasshopper in the family Acrididae. It is found in southern Europe and northern Africa.

The IUCN conservation status of Sphingonotus azurescens is "LC", least concern, with no immediate threat to the species' survival. The IUCN status was assessed in 2015.

References

External links

 

Oedipodinae